These are the results of the women's épée competition in fencing at the 2004 Summer Olympics in Athens.  A total of 39 women competed in this event.  Competition took place in the Fencing Hall at the Helliniko Olympic Complex on August 15.

Tournament results

Preliminary round
As there were more than 32 entrants in this event, seven first round matches were held to reduce the field to 32 fencers.

Main tournament bracket
The remaining field of 32 fencers competed in a single-elimination tournament to determine the medal winners.  Semifinal losers proceeded to a bronze medal match.

Results

References

Yahoo! Sports Athens 2004 Summer Olympics Fencing Results

Women's épée
2004 in women's fencing
Women's events at the 2004 Summer Olympics